Beginning in 2013, The Daytime Emmy Awards currently give out two awards to honor hosts of culinary, craft, and lifestyle programming. The categories are Outstanding Culinary Host and Outstanding Lifestyle/Travel Host.  The category originated in 1994 and was known as the Outstanding Service Host. Prior to that, hosts of service and craft shows would compete in the Outstanding Talk Show Host category. In 2007, the category name was changed to Outstanding Lifestyle Host and was changed again in 2009 to Outstanding Lifestyle/Culinary Host.

Winners

Outstanding Service Show Host (1994-2006) 

1994: T. Berry Brazelton, What Every Baby Knows
1995: Martha Stewart, Martha Stewart Living
1996: Julia Child, It's Julia's Kitchen with Master Chefs
1997: Martha Stewart, Martha Stewart Living
1998: Steve Thomas, This Old House
1999: Ming Tsai, East Meets West with Ming Tsai
2000: Christopher Lowell, It's Christopher Lowell
2001: Julia Child and Jacques Pépin, Julia and Jacques Cooking at Home
2002: Martha Stewart, Martha Stewart Living
2003: Martha Stewart, Martha Stewart Living
2004: Suze Orman, The Suze Orman Show
2005: Bobby Flay, Boy Meets Grill and Michael Chiarello, Easy Entertaining with Michael Chiarello (tie)
2006: Suze Orman, The Suze Orman Show

Outstanding Lifestyle Host (2007-2008) 

2007: Paula Deen, Paula's Home Cooking
2008: Giada De Laurentiis, Everyday Italian

Outstanding Lifestyle/Culinary Host (2009-2012) 

2009: Ina Garten, Barefoot Contessa
2010: Ina Garten, Barefoot Contessa 
2011: Martha Stewart, Martha
2012: Sandra Lee, Semi-Homemade Cooking with Sandra Lee

Outstanding Culinary Host (2013-) 

2013: Lidia Bastianich, Lidia's Italy
2014: Bobby Flay, Bobby Flay's Barbecue Addiction
2015: Bobby Flay, Bobby Flay's Barbecue Addiction
2016: Gabrielle Hamilton and David Kinch, The Mind of a Chef
2017: Ina Garten, Barefoot Contessa
2018: Lidia Bastianich, Lidia's Kitchen
2019: Valerie Bertinelli, Valerie's Home Cooking
2020: Giada De Laurentiis, Giada Entertains
2021: Ina Garten, Barefoot Contessa
2022: Frankie Celenza, Struggle Meals

Outstanding Host in a Lifestyle/Travel Program (2013-2014) 

2013: Leeza Gibbons, My Generation
2014: Joseph Rosendo, Joseph Rosendo’s Travelscope

Outstanding Lifestyle/Travel/Children's Series Host (2015-2016) 
2015: Brandon McMillan, Lucky Dog
2016: Jeff Corwin, Ocean Mysteries with Jeff Corwin

Outstanding Host in a Lifestyle/Travel/Children's or Family Viewing Program (2017-2018)
2017: Joseph Rosendo, Joseph Rosendo’s Travelscope
2018: Brandon McMillan, Lucky Dog

Outstanding Host for a Lifestyle, Children's or Special Class Program (2019-)
2019: Samantha Brown, Samantha Brown's Places to Love

Multiple wins 
5 wins
 Martha Stewart

4 wins
 Ina Garten

3 wins
 Bobby Flay

2 wins
 Joseph Rosendo

 Julia Child

 Lidia Bastianich

 Giada De Laurentiis

 Brandon McMillan

 Suze Orman

Daytime Emmy Awards